Baccaurea is a genus of flowering plant belonging to the  family Phyllanthaceae. The genus comprises over 100 species, distributed from Malesia to the West Pacific. It is dioecious, with male and female flowers on separate plants. Many species contain edible fruits.

Selected species
Species are:

References

External links
 
 

 
Phyllanthaceae genera
Dioecious plants